Teisendorf station is a railway station in the municipality of Teisendorf, located in the Berchtesgadener Land district in Bavaria, Germany.

References

Railway stations in Bavaria
Buildings and structures in Berchtesgadener Land